Vyt-lès-Belvoir (literally: "Vyt near Belvoir") is a commune in the Doubs department in the Bourgogne-Franche-Comté region in eastern France.

Population

See also 
Communes of the Doubs department

References

Communes of Doubs